Saying Something You Have Already Said Before: A Quiet Side of Moneen is an EP/DVD by the rock band Moneen. The CD side of the disc includes four acoustic versions of songs that were on The Red Tree as well as a previously unreleased song. The DVD side of the disc includes live footage of four songs performed by Moneen during a show at The Opera House in Toronto, Ontario in June 2006.

Track listing

CD Side

DVD Side

References

Moneen albums
2006 EPs
2006 video albums
2006 live albums
Live video albums